Kombayendeh is a village in Lei Chiefdom, Kono District in the Eastern Province of Sierra Leone. The major industry in the village is farming.

The inhabitants of Kombayendeh village are almost entirely from the Kono ethnic group. The Kono language is the primary language of communication in the village.

Eastern Province, Sierra Leone
Villages in Sierra Leone